The 1986 NAIA World Series was the 30th annual tournament hosted by the National Association of Intercollegiate Athletics to determine the national champion of baseball among its member colleges and universities in the United States and Canada.

The tournament was played at Harris Field in Lewiston, Idaho.

Grand Canyon (55–18) defeated hosts and two-time defending champions Lewis–Clark State (55–11) in a single-game championship series, 6–5 (after 10 innings), to win the Antelopes' fourth NAIA World Series and first since 1982.

Grand Canyon first baseman Greg Duce was named tournament MVP.

Bracket

Preliminary bracket

Championship bracket

See also
 1986 NCAA Division I baseball tournament
 1986 NCAA Division II baseball tournament
 1986 NCAA Division III baseball tournament
 1986 NAIA Softball World Series

Reference

|NAIA World Series
NAIA World Series
NAIA World Series
NAIA World Series